Ceroplesis sudanica is a species of beetle in the family Cerambycidae. It was described by Per Olof Christopher Aurivillius in 1925. It is known from Sudan, from which its species epithet is derived.

References

Endemic fauna of Sudan
sudanica
Beetles described in 1925